Peteria is a genus of flowering plants in the legume family, Fabaceae. It belongs to the subfamily Faboideae. It is native to USA and Mexico.

It is found in the American states of Arizona, California, Idaho, Nevada, New Mexico, Texas and Utah. As well as central, north-eastern and Mexico Gulf, in Mexico.

The genus name of Peteria is in honour of Robert Peter (1805–1894), an English-born American botanist, chemist, doctor, zoologist and geologist; founder of the University of Louisville School of Medicine.

The genus was circumscribed by Asa Gray in Smithsonian Contr. Knowl. vol.3 (Issue 5) on page 50 in 1852.

Species
Plants of the World Online include;
 Peteria glandulosa 
 Peteria pinetorum 
 Peteria scoparia 
 Peteria thompsoniae

References

Robinieae
Fabaceae genera
Flora of Idaho
Flora of the Southwestern United States
Flora of the South-Central United States
Flora of Central Mexico
Flora of Northeastern Mexico
Flora of Veracruz
Taxa named by Asa Gray